Chelsea is an unincorporated community in Chattooga County, in the U.S. state of Georgia.

History
A post office called Chelsea was established in 1890, and remained in operation until it was discontinued in 1928. The community most likely was named after Chelsea, London.

Little remains of the original community.

References

Unincorporated communities in Chattooga County, Georgia
Unincorporated communities in Georgia (U.S. state)